Betty Heidler (born 14 October 1983) is a retired German track and field athlete who competed in the hammer throw. She held the world record from 2011 until 2014 with her personal best throw of 79.42 m (260 ft 6 in). She is the 2012 Olympic silver medallist, the 2007 World champion and the 2009 and 2011 World Championship silver medallist. She also finished fourth in the Olympic finals in 2004 and 2016.

Career
She now lives in Frankfurt and is a member of the Eintracht Frankfurt athletics team. She works for the German Federal Police where she is a member of the sports support group and started studying Bachelor of Laws at the Fernuniversität Hagen in 2007.

She put in a dominant performance at the 2010 European Cup Winter Throwing with a winning mark of 72.48 m, beating her nearest rival by more than three metres.

Heidler won the inaugural IAAF Hammer Throw Challenge in 2010, finishing at the top of the rankings ahead of Anita Wlodarczyk. She won the gold medal at the 2010 European Athletics Championships then went on to take the silver medal at the 2011 World Championships in Athletics. In May 2011, in Halle, she achieved a new world record in hammer throw, with a result of 79.42 m. She began the 2012 season with a series of wins, performing at the Colorful Daegu Meeting, Golden Spike Ostrava, and Prefontaine Classic.

Heidler won a medal at the 2012 London Olympics. The event was not without controversy as the referees first failed to correctly measure Heidler's bronze-winning throw. She was then later promoted to the silver medal position, after Tatyana Lysenko was disqualified for a doping violation in 2016.

Achievements

References

External links

 
 
 
 
 
 

1983 births
Living people
Athletes from Berlin
German female hammer throwers
German national athletics champions
Athletes (track and field) at the 2004 Summer Olympics
Athletes (track and field) at the 2008 Summer Olympics
Athletes (track and field) at the 2012 Summer Olympics
Athletes (track and field) at the 2016 Summer Olympics
Olympic athletes of Germany
Eintracht Frankfurt athletes
World record setters in athletics (track and field)
World Athletics Championships medalists
European Athletics Championships medalists
Medalists at the 2012 Summer Olympics
World Athletics Championships athletes for Germany
Olympic silver medalists in athletics (track and field)
Universiade medalists in athletics (track and field)
Universiade gold medalists for Germany
Olympic silver medalists for Germany
World Athletics Championships winners
IAAF World Athletics Final winners
Medalists at the 2009 Summer Universiade